Cody Glenn (born October 6, 1986) is a former American football linebacker in the National Football League (NFL). He was drafted by the Washington Redskins in the fifth round of the 2009 NFL Draft. He played college football at the University of Nebraska–Lincoln.

Glenn was also a member of the Indianapolis Colts and Baltimore Ravens.

Early years
Glenn played high school football at Rusk High School.  He was originally a running back who only switched to linebacker in his 4th year at Nebraska.  In his four years in high school, he rushed for 6,353 yards and 87 touchdowns.  His total rushing yards rank eighth in Texas Class 3A history and 27th overall in the entire state of Texas.

College career
In 2008 Glenn moved from running back to linebacker and in nine games, he racked up 51 tackles, including six tackles for loss and four pass breakups. In 2007, he played in five games and finished with 27 carries for 78 yards and also finished the year with six catches for 52 yards. In 2006, he gained 370 yards and scored a team-high eight touchdowns. In 2005, he was as a short-yardage back and finished with 131 yards and four touchdowns on 45 carries.

Professional

Washington Redskins
Glenn was drafted by the Washington Redskins in the fifth round, with the 158th overall pick, in the 2009 NFL Draft. The Redskins waived him on September 5, 2009.

Indianapolis Colts
On September 6, 2009, Glenn was claimed off waivers by the Indianapolis Colts. The team waived him on September 15, but signed him to the practice squad two days later.

Baltimore Ravens
Glenn signed a futures contract with Baltimore Ravens on January 26, 2012. He was waived by the team on June 13.

Personal
Glenn did a promotional video for Trinity Mother Frances Health System, where he had both shoulders surgically repaired from dislocations during his high school career.

References

External links
Indianapolis Colts bio
Nebraska Cornhuskers bio

1986 births
Living people
People from Rusk, Texas
Players of American football from Texas
American football linebackers
Nebraska Cornhuskers football players
Washington Redskins players
Indianapolis Colts players